Los Angeles Force is an American professional soccer club based in Los Angeles, California, that plays in the National Independent Soccer Association (NISA).

History
On August 2, 2019, the National Independent Soccer Association announced the addition of Los Angeles Force ahead of the league's inaugural 2019 Fall Showcase. The club is affiliated with NISA Nation side FC Golden State Force.

Stadium
For the 2019 NISA Fall Showcase, the team played its home matches at Rio Hondo College in Whittier, California. Starting with the 2020 Spring season, the team moved to Los Angeles, and is using the newly renovated stadium on the campus of California State University - Los Angeles.

During the 2021 fall season, the Force primarily used Valley High School's facility in Santa Ana, except for two matches at Championship Soccer Stadium in Irvine. For the 2022 season, the Force are using 6 different stadia, including Championship Stadium (1 match, plus another at Great Park's turf field 10 adjacent), one match at Garey High School in Pomona, one at Yates Field in Chino, two at Covina District Field in Covina, and 4 at LA Harbor College's stadium.

Players and staff

Current roster

Coaching staff

Statistics and records

Season-by-season

References

External links
 

 
Soccer clubs in Los Angeles
2019 establishments in California
National Independent Soccer Association teams
Association football clubs established in 2019